The 2007 CPISRA Football 7-a-side World Championships was the world championship for men's national 7-a-side association football teams. CPISRA stands for Cerebral Palsy International Sports & Recreation Association. Athletes with a physical disability competed. The Championship took place in Brazil from 5 November to 18 November 2007.

Football 7-a-side was played with modified FIFA rules. Among the modifications were that there were seven players, no offside, a smaller playing field, and permission for one-handed throw-ins. Matches consisted of two thirty-minute halves, with a fifteen-minute half-time break. The Championships was a qualifying event for the Beijing 2008 Paralympic Games.

Participating teams and officials

Qualifying 
The following teams are qualified for the tournament:

The draw 
During the draw, the teams were divided into pots because of rankings. Here, the following groups:

Venues 
The venues to be used for the World Championships were located in Deodoro, Rio de Janeiro.

Format 

The first round, or group stage, was a competition between the 16 teams divided among four groups of four, where each group engaged in a round-robin tournament within itself. The two highest ranked teams in each group advanced to the knockout stage for the position one to eight. the two lower ranked teams plays for the positions nine to 16. Teams were awarded three points for a win and one for a draw. When comparing teams in a group over-all result came before head-to-head.

In the knockout stage there were three rounds (quarter-finals, semi-finals, and the final). The winners plays for the higher positions, the losers for the lower positions. For any match in the knockout stage, a draw after 60 minutes of regulation time was followed by two 10 minute periods of extra time to determine a winner. If the teams were still tied, a penalty shoot-out was held to determine a winner.

Classification
Athletes with a physical disability competed. The athlete's disability was caused by a non-progressive brain damage that affects motor control, such as cerebral palsy, traumatic brain injury or stroke. Athletes must be ambulant.

Players were classified by level of disability.
 C5: Athletes with difficulties when walking and running, but not in standing or when kicking the ball.
 C6: Athletes with control and co-ordination problems of their upper limbs, especially when running.
 C7: Athletes with hemiplegia.
 C8: Athletes with minimal disability; must meet eligibility criteria and have an impairment that has impact on the sport of football.

Teams must field at least one class C5 or C6 player at all times. No more than two players of class C8 are permitted to play at the same time.

Group stage 
The first round, or group stage, have seen the sixteen teams divided into four groups of four teams. In any every match a maximum of 10 goals scored were counted. This is indicated with an asterisk (*).

Group A

Group B

Group C

Group D

Knockout stage

Quarter-finals 
Position 9-16

Position 1-8

Semi-finals 
Position 12-16

Position 9-12

Position 5-8

Position 1-4

Finals 
Position 15-16

Position 13-14

Position 11-12

Position 9-10

Position 7-8

Position 5-6

Position 3-4

Final

Statistics

Goalscorers 
8 goals
  Luciano Rocha

7 goals
  Taras Dutko

6 goals

  David Cantoni
  Abdolreza Karimizadeh
  Wayne Ward

5 Goals
  Jose Carlos Guimaraes

4 goals

  Finbarr O'riordan
  Denys Ponomaryov
  Ivan Shkvarlo
  Sefik Smajlovic
  Marthell Vazquez

3 goals

  David Barber
  Pavel Borisov
  Fabiano Bruzzi
  Mamuka Dzimistarishvili
  Luke Evans
  Sebastian Garcia
  Andrey Kuvaev
  Stephan Lokhoff
  Wanderson Oliveira
  Flavio Pereira
  Christopher Pyne
  Christo Titus

2 goals

  Moslem Akibari
  Michael Barker
  Matthew Brown
  Paul Dollard
  Olexiy Hetun
  Volodymyr Kabanov
  Houshang Khosravani
  Stanislav Kolykhalov
  Thozamile Lurane
  Leandro Marinho
  Gary Messett
  Atashafrouz Rasoul
  Jean Rodrigues
  Marcos Salazar
  Shaun Schetka
  Alexey Tchesmine
  Vitaliy Trushev
  Fang Wan
  Xu Zhu

1 goal

  Taylor Andrew
  Bahman Ansari
  Derek Arneaud
  Pedro Gonçalves
  Dustin Hodgson
  Renato Lima
  Andrey Lovetchnikov
  Josh Mckinney
  Mariano Morana
  Claudio Morinigo
  Malito Nxumalo
  Alan O'hara
  Graeme Paterson
  Jonathan Paterson
  Todd Phillips
  Ivan Potekhin
  Fox Richard
  Johannes Swinkels
  Andriy Tsukanov
  Sergiy Vakulenko
  Hendrikus Van Kempen
  Guojun Xu, Guojun
  Lang Yunlong
  Ryuta Yoshino

Ranking

See also

References

External links 
 Official website from 19 December 2007
 Homepage of ANDE from 19. December 2007
 Cerebral Palsy International Sports & Recreation Association (CPISRA)
 International Federation of Cerebral Palsy Football (IFCPF)

2007 in association football
2007
Paralympic association football
CP football